The Tango Desktop Project was an open-source initiative to create a set of design guidelines and to provide a consistent user experience for applications on desktop environments. The project created a set of icons known as the Tango Icon Library and that were described as a "proof of concept". The Tango Desktop Project was a project of freedesktop.org, and was closely linked with other freedesktop.org guidelines, such as the Standard Icon Theming Specification.

Objectives
The objective of the project was to allow software developers to easily integrate their software, in terms of appearance, with the desktop computer. The visual inconsistencies that arise from different desktop environments (such as KDE, GNOME, or Xfce) and custom distributions make it hard for third parties to target Linux. Ideally, any project that follows the Tango guidelines will have a look and feel that matches well with other icons and applications that follow the guidelines.

The style did not aim to be visually unique to distinguish itself. Instead, a secondary aim of the project was to create a standard style that makes applications look appropriate running on operating systems common at that time, such that independent software vendors would find that their application did not look out of place on Windows XP, Mac OS X, KDE, GNOME, or Xfce.

Apart from the visual guidelines, the project aimed to provide a set of common metaphors for the icons. Tango followed the freedesktop.org's Standard Icon Theming Specification and actively developed the freedesktop.org's Standard Icon Naming Specification, defining names for the most common icons and the used metaphors.

Many free software projects, such as GIMP, Scribus, and GNOME, have started to follow the Tango style guidelines for their icons. Also, ReactOS uses Tango icons, as does Mozilla Firefox 3 when it is unable to find the user's installed icon set or for icons not covered by said icon set.

It is also possible for proprietary closed-source applications to use Tango Desktop Project icons. Examples highlighted by the Tango Showroom include VMware Workstation 6 and Medsphere OpenVista CIS.

History
The Tango icons were originally released under a copyleft Creative Commons license (Attribution-ShareAlike), but were released into the public domain in 2009 in order to make it easier to reuse them.

Palette
This is the hexadecimal color palette used by the Tango Desktop Project, organized by color group and brightness:

See also

 Bluecurve – former default GPL icon set of Fedora, replaced by Echo
 Crystal – LGPL icon set by Geraldo Coelho
 Icon (computing)
 Nuvola – LGPL icon set by David Vignoni
 Oxygen Project – LGPL icon set for KDE
 Palette (computing)
 Theme (computing)
 ReactOS – uses the Tango Icon Library

References

External links

 
 Tango Icon Library version 0.8.90 — in tar.gz archive format
 "Tango project aims to clean up the desktop" on Linux.com
 Standard Icon Theming Specification
 Icon Naming Specification
 Tango Patcher 2600 8.06

2009 software
Communication design
Computer icons
Free software projects
Freedesktop.org
GNOME
Graphics